Trevelyan Edward (1938 – 1995) was a cricketer who played nine matches of first-class cricket for Ceylon between 1961 and 1965.

Trevelyan Edward attended S. Thomas' College, Mount Lavinia. An opening batsman who wore spectacles, he made his debut for Ceylon in the Gopalan Trophy match in 1960–61, opening with A. C. M. Lafir. In the 1961-62 Gopalan Trophy match he made his highest first-class score, 73, in an innings victory for Ceylon.

He toured India with the Ceylon team in 1964-65, playing in all three matches against India. In the first two matches he was one of Ceylon's more successful batsmen, with scores of 38, 31, 53 and 15. In the third and last match, while he was fielding in the slips in the Indian first innings, a ball struck him over the eye, breaking his spectacles and necessitating several stitches in the wound. He could play no further part in the game, which Ceylon nevertheless won, their first victory in a full international match. It was his last first-class match, but he continued to play domestic cricket for Nondescripts.

References

External links

1938 births
1995 deaths
Sri Lankan cricketers
All-Ceylon cricketers
Alumni of S. Thomas' College, Mount Lavinia
Nondescripts Cricket Club cricketers